Dr. Joycelyn Wilson is an Assistant Professor of Hip Hop Studies and Digital Humanities in the Black Media Studies cohort, located in the School of Literature, Media, and Communication in the Ivan Allen College at the Georgia Institute of Technology. As an educational anthropologist, Wilson is an expert in African-American music and performance - with particular interests in contemporary modes of cultural production in the American South and Hip Hop in general, as well as their broad impact on higher education. She is also the founder and CEO of the HipHop2020 Archive and Innovation Lab, an educational resources design studio inspired by the Hip Hop Archive.

Early life 
Born in Tuscaloosa, Alabama, Wilson grew up in Southwest Atlanta "SWATS" neighborhood. She graduated from Benjamin E. Mays High School before enrolling in University of Georgia where she completed her BS in Mathematics and PhD in Educational Anthropology. She also has a Master's from Pepperdine University.

Career 
Wilson has written for several market-leading publications including FADER, XXL, The Source, Rap Pages, and wax poetics - often introducing budding artists to a wider audience. Currently, she is a music and culture columnist for The Bitter Southerner, where she writes about the history of Atlanta culture, Down South Hip Hop, Trap, race, and technology. Wilson’s expertise expands well into topics such as pop culture, social justice content production, and justice-oriented humanities instruction in STEAM (science, technology, engineering, arts, and mathematics). She is an Emmy-nominated documentary film producer by the Southeast division of the National Academy of Television Arts and Sciences (NATAS). She is known for pioneering scholarship that focuses on the impact and legacy of Atlanta rap duo Outkast and Down South Hip Hip Studies as an area of study. Wilson has been recognized for her use of Hip Hop as a technology of representation in her Georgia Tech computational media and humanities classes.

Public engagement 
Wilson has consulted with educational leaders, politicians, community organizations, and corporations. Wilson speaks on pop culture, Atlanta Hip Hop, schooling in American society, and the cultural histories of civil rights and social justice in the South. She also can comment on Hip Hop’s intersection with pedagogy, politics, and culture and discuss issues of social justice, educational anthropology, and technology. She is also available to speak broadly about the digital humanities and computational media, including interactive narrative, digital archiving, and experimental digital media.

See also 

 Ratchet feminism

References

Selected videos
The Intersection of Hip-Hop and Social Justice, A Community Dialogue Honoring the Legacy of Nipsey Hussle 
Closer Look: ‘Hidden Figures’; Women In Hip-Hop; And More
The OutKast Imagination -  TED Talk at Virginia Tech on the influence of Hip-Hop and the unique benefits it can bring to education
Conversation with Kid Cudi in her Hip-Hop 2020 class at Morehouse
Featured alongside Ludacris, Usher, T.I., Jeezy, Lil Jon, Future, and Jermaine Dupri in discussing how Atlanta rose to prominence

Georgia Tech faculty
American feminist writers
Hip hop people
Living people
Black studies scholars
Historians of African Americans
Popular culture studies
People from Atlanta
Year of birth missing (living people)